Crawshays Welsh RFC is an invitational rugby union team.

In 1922 Captain Geoffrey Crawshay was invited by the Engineer Commander of Devonport Services, SF Coopper, to bring a team of Welsh rugby union players to play Devonport Services R.F.C.

They are mainly a touring team who play fast entertaining rugby. It is regarded an honour to be invited to play for such a prestigious team. They are usually, a mix of seasoned internationals, and promising youngsters, with the occasional local player available at short notice. Many Wales rugby legends have played for them, including JPR Williams, Phil Bennett and [[Jonathan Davies] [Allan J. Martin]rugby, born 1962)|Jonathan Davies]].

From 1923 Crawshays Welsh Touring XV started to include Camborne RFC on their fixture list and this was to become a regular annual fixture for many years. In 1926-27 Camborne RFC achieved their first win over a Crawshay's side and the two sides played most recently in 2003 when Camborne celebrated their 125th anniversary season.

Crawshays Welsh XV have played all over the rugby playing world. There is also an under 19 team that travels extensively and it is not unusual to for them to field a team in the international sevens tournaments.

Links

Crawshays.com Official website

References

Welsh rugby union teams
Crawshays RFC players